The Houston Hurricanes were a soccer club that competed in the United Soccer Leagues from 1996 to 2000.

Description and history
The Hurricanes were a Division III (D-3) franchise, and their Major League Soccer affiliation was with the Kansas City Wizards owned by Joseph "Joey" Marc Serralta Ives and family making him the first Puerto Rican to own a professional sports franchise in the United States. Attendance averaged about 1,000 or less per game for the club's five seasons, and the franchise ceased playing in the USISL after the 2000 season and participated in the Lone Star Alliance before folding in 2001. The team's most successful season was 1997, when they reached .500 in the regular season and won the 1997 Divisional Championship before losing its Regional Championship game to the San Francisco Bay Seals. The team was coached by Mario Deglinocenti in 1996, Richard Pardo 1997, Marty Espinoza 1998, Vieira 1999, Jaime Rodriguez 2000 and Luis Morales in 2001. The team played its home games at Butler Stadium in Houston.

Year-by-year

2012
Houston Hurricanes  join NPSL
Owner - Brendan Keyes.
Head Coach - Brendan Keyes

References

External links
Soccertimes.com page on the Houston Hurricanes
Standings and club information for 1996, 1997-99 and 2000 for current Houston Hurricanes FC(http://www.HoustonHurricanesfc.com
1997-2000 attendance figures for the Houston Hurricanes

Defunct soccer clubs in Texas
Hurricanes
USL Second Division teams
2001 disestablishments in Texas
1996 establishments in Texas
Soccer clubs in Texas
Association football clubs established in 1996
Association football clubs disestablished in 2001